The Honda Grom (MSX125 in Europe and East Asia) is a  air-cooled standard motorcycle made by Honda Motor Co. Inc. It won the Motorcycle USA Motorcycle of the Year prize for 2014.

Economy and performance

Variants and similar models
The Honda Grom is part of Honda's "miniMOTO" line up of "pocket-sized" motorcycles (small displacement, generally 125cc or lower and sometimes referred to as "Pocket bikes," "Minibikes," or "Tiny Motorcycles. Other motorcycles under the miniMOTO lineup include the MONKEY, SUPER CUB C125, TRAIL125 ABS, and NAVI.

References

External links

Grom
Standard motorcycles
Motorcycles introduced in 2014